= Leevale, West Virginia =

Leevale
- Unincorporated community
- Location within the state of West Virginia Leevale (the United States)
- Coordinates: 37°57′58″N 81°31′30″W
- Country: United States
- State: West Virginia
- County: Raleigh
- Elevation: 860 ft (260 m)
- Time zone: UTC-5 (Eastern (EST))
  - Summer (DST): UTC-4 (EDT)
- GNIS ID: 1541614

Leevale is an unincorporated community in Raleigh County, West Virginia, United States.
